The Local Fuzz is the fifth studio album by American rock band The Atomic Bitchwax, released in 2011 by Tee Pee Records. Consisting of a single extended piece of music it was based on the intention of "50 riffs in 40 minutes".

Track listing
All songs by The Atomic Bitchwax unless noted.
 "The Local Fuzz" – 42:16

Critical reception
The Local Fuzz was noted as a somewhat strange addition to TAB's music, given the single song, however it was rated moderately positively. PopMatters rated it as 6/10 and "ambitious and well-executed", although requiring significant adaptation from the band's usual audience.

References

External links
 
 Tee Pee Records

2011 albums
The Atomic Bitchwax albums
Tee Pee Records albums